Yolanda Nicole Fargas (born May 21, 1972) is an American basketball coach and executive. She is the president of the Las Vegas Aces of the WNBA. Fargas was formerly the head coach for the women's basketball programs at UCLA and LSU.

Early life
Born Yolanda Nicole Caldwell in Oak Ridge, Tennessee, Fargas was raised by her mother and attended public schools. She graduated from Oak Ridge High School in 1990. She was a member of the school basketball team that won the Tennessee state championship in 1988. As of 2009, Fargas still held the high school's single-season records for total points scored and for successful free throws.

College and career
Fargas attended the University of Tennessee from 1990 to 1994, playing as a guard under coach Pat Summitt on the university's Lady Vols basketball team, which compiled a 118–13 won-loss record during her playing years. Fargas was known for her strong defensive play and her three-point shooting. Her defensive play in the 1991 NCAA tournament final game, in which the Lady Vols defeated the University of Virginia in overtime, was considered a key factor in her team's victory. She was named to Southeastern Conference (SEC) All-Freshman team that same year, and in both her junior and senior years she received the university's Gloria Ray Leadership Award. Although she missed portions of two seasons due to injuries, her four-year statistics as a three-point shooter, with 128 three-point field goals made out of 364 attempts, place her in the all-time top 10 at Tennessee.

Broadcasting
After receiving a bachelor's degree in public relations from the University of Tennessee in 1994, Fargas became a color analyst for Fox Sports Net South broadcasts of Lady Vol basketball games. In 1995 she added the position of color analyst for Fox broadcasts of the SEC Game of the Week, which she continued until 1997, when she became host for sports segments on the Shop at Home Network.

Coaching

Tennessee
Fargas returned to basketball in 1998 as a member of Pat Summitt's coaching staff, serving as graduate assistant for administration. The following season she joined the University of Virginia as an assistant coach, assuming responsibilities for recruiting, scouting, film exchange, player development, monitoring academic progress and camps. In 2002, she left Virginia to return to the University of Tennessee as an assistant coach for the 2002–03 season and recruiting director beginning in the spring of 2003.

UCLA
Fargas was named the head coach at UCLA on April 17, 2008, with a five-year contract valued at nearly $1.5 million, succeeding Kathy Olivier. In her first season as coach, UCLA compiled a regular season record of 18 wins and 11 losses. During the 2009–2010 season, UCLA placed second in the Pac-10 (25–9) and was defeated by second-ranked Stanford in the Pac-10 tournament. She sought a large raise in her contract. Despite a reported offer of a generous increase by UCLA, the school could not match the $900,000 annually that LSU offered so she returned to coach in the SEC at LSU.

LSU
On April 2, 2011, Louisiana State University announced that Fargas would become the head coach for the LSU Lady Tigers team. In seven seasons with the Lady Tigers, she posted a 131–90 record and advanced to the NCAA Tournament in her first seven seasons. She posted her first losing record in 2016 and missed the NCAA tournament for the first time. Fargas resigned from LSU in April 2021.

WNBA
On May 11, 2021, Fargas was announced as the President of the Las Vegas Aces. In her first season with the franchise they won their first WNBA Finals in team history.

Head coaching record

NCAA tournament

Public service activities
In the company of Holly Warlick, a former assistant coach for University of Tennessee women's basketball, Fargas has conducted three long-distance motorcycle road trips, called "Cruisin' for a Cause", to promote awareness of breast cancer and to raise money for research on this disease. In their first trip, in 2007, they rode their Harley-Davidson motorcycles from Berkeley, California to Knoxville, Tennessee. As of 2008, the two women's non-profit organization, Champions for a Cause, had raised nearly $100,000. The 2010 road trip took them through Washington, DC and New York City to Niagara Falls and back.

Awards
In May 2009 Fargas received the Woman of Excellence Award from the LadyLike Foundation for her excellence as a coach and for fund-raising activities for breast cancer awareness.
Fargas was named 2010 Pac-10 Coach of the Year by the conference coaches and by the media in her second year of coaching at UCLA.

Family
Fargas' uncle, Mike Caldwell, played for the Philadelphia Eagles in the National Football League. In March 2012, Fargas gave birth to a girl named Justice with her husband, former Oakland Raiders player Justin Fargas (coincidentally, the Raiders ownership acquired the Aces when she joined the team). Her father-in-law is Starsky and Hutch actor Antonio Fargas, who played Huggy Bear.

References

External links
LSU Lady Tigers bio
Champions for a Cause website

1972 births
Living people
African-American basketball coaches
American color commentators
American women's basketball coaches
Basketball coaches from Tennessee
Basketball players from Tennessee
LSU Lady Tigers basketball coaches
People from Oak Ridge, Tennessee
Tennessee Lady Volunteers basketball coaches
Tennessee Lady Volunteers basketball players
UCLA Bruins women's basketball coaches
Virginia Cavaliers women's basketball coaches
Las Vegas Aces
21st-century African-American sportspeople
21st-century African-American women
20th-century African-American sportspeople
20th-century African-American women